Charan Rai is an Indian footballer who plays as Striker for Mohammedan in I-League

External links
 

Living people
Indian footballers
Churchill Brothers FC Goa players
Association football forwards
Year of birth missing (living people)